Pristolepis is a genus of fish in the family Pristolepididae sometimes classified in the order Anabantiformes native to freshwater habitats in Southeast Asia and India's Western Ghats. This genus is the only member of its family, a family which, with the families Nandidae and Polycentridae is a group of taxa which are sisters to the Anabantiformes and form part of an unnamed and unranked clade within the series Ovalentaria, closest to the Carangiformes. These three families share the common name "leaffish" .

Species
There are currently 8 recognized species in this genus:

 Pristolepis fasciata (Bleeker, 1851) (Malayan leaffish)
 Pristolepis grootii (Bleeker, 1852) (Indonesian leaffish)
 Pristolepis malabarica (Günther, 1864)
 Pristolepis marginata Jerdon, 1849 (Malabar leaffish)
 Pristolepis pauciradiata Plamoottil & Win, 2017  (Myanmar Leaf fish)
 Pristolepis pentacantha Plamoottil, 2014 (Wayanad leaffish)
 Pristolepis procerus Plamoottil, 2017 (Deep- Bodied Leaffish)
 Pristolepis rubripinnis Britz, Krishna Kumar & Baby, 2012

References

Ray-finned fish genera
Fish of India
Pristolepididae